French Lick Municipal Airport  is a city-owned public-use airport located three nautical miles (6 km) southwest of the central business district of French Lick, a town in Orange County, Indiana, United States. Also known as French Lick Airport, it serves the French Lick and West Baden, Indiana area.

Facilities and aircraft 
It has one asphalt paved runway designated 8/26 which measures 5,500 by 100 feet (1,676 x 30 m).

For the 12-month period ending December 31, 2007, the airport had 8,795 aircraft operations, an average of 24 per day: 94% general aviation, 5% air taxi and 1% military. At that time there were 18 aircraft based at this airport: 61% single-engine and 39% ultralight.

References

External links 
 French Lick Airport, official site
 
 Aerial photo as of 5 April 1998 from USGS The National Map
 

Airports in Indiana
Transportation buildings and structures in Orange County, Indiana